Semigallia is one of the five multi-member constituencies of the Saeima, the national legislature of Latvia. The constituency was established in 1922 when the Saeima was established following Latvia's independence from the Soviet Union. It consists of the city of Jelgava and municipalities of Aizkraukle, Bauska, Dobele, Jēkabpils, Jelgava and Tukums in the region of Semigallia. The constituency currently elects 13 of the 100 members of the Saeima using the open party-list proportional representation electoral system. At the 2022 parliamentary election it had 205,937 registered electors.

Electoral system
Semigallia currently elects 13 of the 100 members of the Saeima using the open party-list proportional representation electoral system. Constituency seats are allocated using the Sainte-Laguë method. Only parties that reach the 5% national threshold compete for constituency seats (4% in 1993).

Election results

Summary

Detailed

2020s

2022
Results of the 2022 parliamentary election held on 1 October 2022:

The following candidates were elected:
Andris Bērziņš (ZZS), 26,899 votes; Anda Čakša (JV), 26,799 votes; Mārtiņš Daģis (JV), 24,465 votes; Mārtiņš Felss (JV), 24,648 votes; Līga Kļaviņa (ZZS), 26,527 votes; Dmitrijs Kovaļenko (S!), 4,945 votes; Ingmārs Līdaka (AS), 18,236 votes; Edvīns Šnore (NA), 17,722 votes; Atis Švinka (PRO), 6,351 votes; Edgars Tavars (AS), 17,592 votes; Viktors Valainis (ZZS), 31,487 votes; Jānis Vitenbergs (NA), 18,340 votes; and Edmunds Zivtiņš (LPV), 6,958 votes.

2010s

2018
Results of the 2018 parliamentary election held on 6 October 2018:

The following candidates were elected:
Uldis Augulis (ZZS), 15,226 votes; Ilmārs Dūrītis (AP), 13,289 votes; Krišjānis Feldmans (JKP), 19,298 votes; Kaspars Ģirģens (KPV LV), 25,629 votes; Ralfs Nemiro (KPV LV), 25,095 votes; Vitālijs Orlovs (SDPS), 13,120 votes; Artūrs Toms Plešs (AP), 13,448 votes; Jānis Reirs (JV), 10,668 votes; Sandis Riekstiņš (JKP), 17,530 votes; Inguna Rībena (NA), 18,475 votes; Edvīns Šnore (NA), 19,793 votes; Viktors Valainis (ZZS), 15,730 votes; Jānis Vitenbergs (KPV LV), 24,116 votes; and Ivars Zariņš (SDPS), 13,656 votes.

2014
Results of the 2014 parliamentary election held on 4 October 2014:

The following candidates were elected:
Uldis Augulis (ZZS), 39,062 votes; Raimonds Bergmanis (ZZS),39,230 votes; Andris Bērziņš (ZZS), 37,250 votes; Augusts Brigmanis (ZZS), 41,125 votes; Andris Buiķis (NA), 26,144 votes; Atis Lejiņš (V), 32,776 votes; Dainis Liepiņš (LRA), 7,358 votes; Aivars Meija (NSL), 9,900 votes; Vitālijs Orlovs (SDPS), 17,114 votes; Imants Parādnieks (NA), 26,498 votes; Jānis Reirs (V), 32,073 votes; Edvīns Šnore (NA), 29,789 votes; Juris Šulcs (V), 31,592 votes; and Zenta Tretjaka (SDPS), 15,875 votes.

2011
Results of the 2011 parliamentary election held on 17 September 2011:

The following candidates were elected:
Uldis Augulis (ZZS), 22,132 votes; Andris Bērziņš (ZZS), 22,591 votes; Augusts Brigmanis (ZZS), 23,271 votes; Atis Lejiņš (V), 30,472 votes; Klāvs Olšteins (ZRP), 39,133 votes; Vitālijs Orlovs (SC), 27,061 votes; Jānis Ozoliņš (ZRP), 38,739 votes; Imants Parādnieks (NA), 24,793 votes; Vineta Poriņa (NA), 22,450 votes; Jānis Reirs (V), 27,469 votes; Vladimirs Reskājs (SC), 24,966 votes; Viktors Valainis (ZRP), 36,430 votes; Inga Vanaga (ZRP), 36,490 votes; Dzintars Zaķis (V), 29,294 votes; and Ivars Zariņš (SC), 25,507 votes.

2010
Results of the 2010 parliamentary election held on 2 October 2010:

The following candidates were elected:
Uldis Augulis (ZZS), 39,357 votes; Andris Bērziņš (ZZS), 39,709 votes; Augusts Brigmanis (ZZS), 42,495 votes; Aivars Dronka (ZZS), 37,625 votes; Sarmīte Ēlerte (V), 53,607 votes; Valentīns Grigorjevs (SC), 22,433 votes; Artis Kampars (V), 54,134 votes; Atis Lejiņš (V), 54,758 votes; Klāvs Olšteins (V), 49,412 votes; Vitālijs Orlovs (SC), 25,287 votes; Imants Parādnieks (NA), 15,541 votes; Dace Reinika (ZZS), 38,552 votes; Andris Šķēle (PL), 11,643 votes; Aigars Štokenbergs (V), 53,976 votes; and Dzintars Zaķis (V), 52,768 votes.

2000s

2006
Results of the 2006 parliamentary election held on 7 October 2006:

The following candidates were elected:
Dzintars Ābiķis (TP), 31,259 votes; Andris Bērziņš (ZZS), 33,499 votes; Valery Bukhvalov (ЗаПЧЕЛ), 6,005 votes; Artis Kampars (JL), 23,738 votes; Leons Līdums (TP), 30,056 votes; Vitālijs Orlovs (SC), 8,575 votes; Karina Pētersone (LPP/LC), 10,934 votes; Jānis Reirs (JL), 23,410 votes; Baiba Rivža (ZZS), 33,068 votes; Viktors Ščerbatihs (ZZS), 33,341 votes; Atis Slakteris (TP), 32,451 votes; Dagnija Staķe (ZZS), 34,840 votes; Pēteris Tabūns (TB/LNNK), 9,768 votes; Imants Valers (TP), 29,745 votes; and Dzintars Zaķis (JL), 23,870 votes.

2002
Results of the 2002 parliamentary election held on 5 October 2002:

The following candidates were elected:
Andrejs Aleksejevs (ЗаПЧЕЛ), 15,093 votes; Andris Bērziņš (ZZS), 18,568 votes; Augusts Brigmanis (ZZS), 19,225 votes; Jānis Esta (TP), 30,278 votes; Artis Kampars (JL), 39,231 votes; Vineta Muižniece (JL), 38,964 votes; Vitālijs Orlovs (ЗаПЧЕЛ), 15,264 votes; Krišjānis Peters (LPP), 18,504 votes; Mihails Pietkevičs (TP), 29,759 votes; Jānis Reirs (JL), 39,144 votes; Anna Seile (TB/LNNK), 9,572 votes; Jevgenija Stalidzāne (LPP), 18,835 votes; Dzintars Zaķis (JL), 39,005 votes; Ērika Zommere (TP), 30,199 votes; and Ēriks Zunda (TP), 30,240 votes.

1990s

1998
Results of the 1998 parliamentary election held on 3 October 1998:

The following candidates were elected:
Jānis Bunkšs (LC), 26,420 votes; Jānis Čevers (LSDA), 25,459 votes; Silvija Dreimane (JP), 13,719 votes; Jānis Esta (TP), 35,164 votes; Edvīns Inkēns (LC), 26,682 votes; Aigars Kalvītis (TP), 35,092 votes; Kārlis Leiškalns (LC), 26,987 votes; Jānis Leja (LSDA), 25,536 votes; Andrejs Požarnovs (TB/LNNK), 21,203 votes; Boriss Rastropirkins (TSP), 8,061 votes; Arnis Razminovičs (TP), 35,077 votes; Kaspars Riekstiņš (LSDA), 25,526 votes; Atis Slakteris (TP), 36,714 votes; Jevgenija Stalidzāne (JP), 13,809 votes; and Pēteris Tabūns (TB/LNNK), 20,972 votes.

1995
Results of the 1995 parliamentary election held on 30 September and 1 October 1995:

The following candidates were elected:
Romāns Apsītis (LC), 18,715 votes; Vents Balodis (TB), 15,417 votes; Jānis Bunkšs (LC), 18,637 votes; Juris Celmiņš (DPS), 23,605 votes; Guntis Eniņš (TKL), 35,943 votes; Modris Goba (DPS), 23,631 votes; Ervids Grinovskis (LZS-KDS-LDP), 11,957 votes; Janīna Kušnere (TKL), 36,001 votes; Aristids Jēkabs Lambergs (LNNK-LZP), 8,508 votes; Jānis Mauliņš (TKL), 36,087 votes; Modris Plāte (TKL), 36,178 votes; Andrejs Požarnovs (TB), 15,688 votes; Jānis Rāzna (DPS), 23,405 votes; Jānis Rubulis (LVP), 12,642 votes; and Andris Tomašūns (LC), 18,593 votes.

1993
Results of the 1993 parliamentary election held on 5 and 6 June 1993:

The following candidates were elected:
Gundars Bērziņš (LZS), 26,473 votes; Olafs Brūvers (KDS), 8,490 vtes; Aivars Endziņš (LC), 52,312 votes; Māris Gailis (LC), 51,294 votes; Ilga Gore (DCP), 8,765 votes; Oskars Grīgs (LZS), 26,860 votes; Andris Kadeģis (LC), 51,253 votes; Viesturs Pauls Karnups (LNNK), 36,871 votes; Aristids Lambergs (LNNK), 37,518 votes; Roberts Milbergs (TB), 7,957 votes; Egīls Radziņš (LC), 50,704 votes; Joachim Siegerist (LNNK), 44,128 votes; Antita Stankēviča (LC), 52,785 votes; Pēteris Tabūns (LNNK), 50,011 votes; Zigurds Tomiņš (LZS), 26,102 votes; and Jevģenijs Zaščerinskis (SL), 14,388 votes.

1930s

1931
Results of the 1931 parliamentary election held on 3 and 4 October 1931:

1920s

1928
Results of the 1928 parliamentary election held on 6 and 7 October 1928:

1925
Results of the 1925 parliamentary election held on 3 and 4 October 1925:

1922
Results of the 1922 parliamentary election held on 7 and 8 October 1922:

References

Saeima constituencies
Saeima constituencies established in 1922